Abacetus sinuaticollis is a species of ground beetle in the subfamily Pterostichinae. It was described by Straneo in 1939.

References

sinuaticollis
Beetles described in 1939